Pietro Nardini (April 12, 1722 – May 7, 1793) was an Italian composer and violinist, a transitional musician who worked in both the Baroque and Classical era traditions.

Life
Nardini was born in Livorno and studied music at Livorno, later becoming a pupil of Giuseppe Tartini. He moved to Germany where he joined the court chapel in Stuttgart, becoming conductor in 1762. However, he abandoned his duties there in 1765 to become Kapellmeister, in 1770, to the Grand Duke of Tuscany in Florence.

Nardini is mentioned in English writer Hester Lynch Piozzi's Observations and Reflections Made in the Course of a Journey Through France, Italy, and Germany (1789) as playing a solo at a concert Mrs Piozzi and her husband, Gabriele Piozzi, gave in Florence in July 1785.

Though Nardini was not a prolific composer, his works are known for their melodious tunes and usefulness in technical studies. Among the best known are the Sonata in D major and the Concerto in E minor.

As a friend of Leopold Mozart, he witnessed the arrival of Wolfgang Amadeus Mozart on his first visit to Italy and his attempts to find a sustainable position in 1770–1771. He also met the Bohemian composer Václav Pichl, Kapellmeister to the Archduke Ferdinand d'Este, Austrian governor of Lombardy.

He was a teacher to Bartolomeo Campagnoli, Giovanni Francesco Giuliani and probably also to Gaetano Brunetti.

He died in Florence on 7 May 1793, aged 71.

Quotes
Of his playing, Leopold Mozart, himself an eminent violinist, writes:

"The beauty, purity and equality of his tone, and the tastefulness of his cantabile playing, cannot be surpassed; but he does not execute
great difficulties." His compositions are marked by vivacity, grace, and sweet sentimentality, but he has neither the depth of feeling, the grand pathos, nor the concentrated energy of his master Tartini.

Recordings
Overtures and Flute Concertos, Auser Musici, Carlo Ipata, director, Agorà Musica AG 157.1 (2002)

Nardini's Concerto per Violino in mi minore (Violin Concerto in E Minor), was recorded by Pinchas Zucherman, violin, and Members of the Los Angeles Philharmonic, on CBS Masterworks, in the 1970s; now it's available in "Vivaldi, Nardini & Viotti: Italian Violin Concertos", ETERNA 2009.

A Concerto for Violin in F Major, Op. 1, No. 3 was performed on a Stradivarius violin by Andrea Cappelletti with the European Community Chamber Orchestra in 1992.  The recording was released in 1998 on KOCH Schwann Musica Mundi 3-8711-2 under the title, "Tribute to Stradivarius: Virtuoso Violin Concertos."

A Violin Concerto in E Minor performed by Mischa Elman and the Chamber Orchestra of the Vienna State Opera, Vladimir Golschman conducting, was digitally remastered and appeared in 1993 on Vanguard Classics OVC 8033 as part of "The Mischa Elman Collection."
  
Four violin concertos (in C Major, G Major, D Major, and A Major) were recorded in 2001, featuring Mauro Rossi as performer and conductor, on Dynamic CDS392. 

His Six String Quartets are performed by Quartetto Eleusi on Brilliant Classics; https://www.brilliantclassics.com/articles/n/nardini-complete-string-quartets/
 
The Ensemble "ARDI COR MIO" performed four violin sonatas from manuscripts in various European museums and recorded them in 2007 on Tactus TC 721401.

Henryk Szeryng plays Nardini, Vieuxtemps, Ravel & Schumann. Violin Concerto in E Minor. SWR Sinfonieorchester des Südwestrundfunks, Hans Rosbaud.

Ensemble Alraune recorded the duets for two violas on NovAntiqua Records.

The Austrian Eduard Melkus recorded the violin concerto in E-flat Major with the Capella Academica, Wien conducted by August Wenzinger on Archiv Produktion 198370 in February 1966.

References

External links

 
P. Nardini from Tesori Musicali Toscani

Italian male classical composers
Italian Classical-period composers
Italian Roman Catholics
Italian violinists
Male violinists
Pupils of Giuseppe Tartini
1722 births
1793 deaths
18th-century Italian composers
18th-century Italian male musicians